Lewu 乐舞 is an unclassified extinct Loloish language of Jingdong Yi Autonomous County, Yunnan, China. The Lewu are officially classified by the Chinese government as ethnic Yao people.

Demographics
According to the Jingdong County Gazetteer (1994:519), ethnic Yao numbered 3,889 individuals in 1990, and lived mainly in Chaqing 岔箐 and Dasongshu 大松树 Villages of Taizhong Township 太忠乡. Yao language speakers, known as the Lewu Yao 乐舞瑶族, are found in Puya Village 普牙村, Chaqing Township 岔箐乡 (Jingdong County Ethnic Gazetteer 2012:144).

Classification
Lewu may have been related to the Lawu language of Xinping County, Yunnan, but classification remains uncertain due to the paucity of data.

Vocabulary
A word list of the Lewu Yao language is transcribed using pinyin in the Jingdong County Ethnic Gazetteer (2012:144-145). The language is already extinct, and was recorded in 1985 from 85-year-old Zhu Zhaojin 祝兆金 of Puya Village 普牙村, who could remember only some words.

References

Sources
Hsiu, Andrew. 2017. The Lawu languages: footprints along the Red River valley corridor.

Loloish languages
Languages of China